Georgi Nikolov Delchev (Bulgarian/Macedonian: Георги/Ѓорѓи Николов Делчев; 4 February 1872 – 4 May 1903), known as Gotse Delchev or Goce Delčev (Гоце Делчев, originally spelled in older Bulgarian orthography as Гоце Дѣлчевъ), was an important Macedonian Bulgarian revolutionary (komitadji), active in the Ottoman-ruled Macedonia and Adrianople regions at the turn of the 20th century. He was the most prominent leader of what is known today as the Internal Macedonian Revolutionary Organization (IMRO), a secret revolutionary society that was active in Ottoman territories in the Balkans at the end of the 19th and the beginning of the 20th century. Delchev was its representative in Sofia, the capital of the Principality of Bulgaria. As such, he was also elected a member of the Supreme Macedonian-Adrianople Committee (SMAC), participating in the work of its governing body. He was killed in a battle with an Ottoman unit on the eve of the Ilinden-Preobrazhenie uprising.

Born into a Bulgarian family in Kilkis, then in the Salonika Vilayet of the Ottoman Empire, in his youth he was inspired by the ideals of earlier Bulgarian revolutionaries such as Vasil Levski and Hristo Botev, who envisioned the creation of a Bulgarian republic of ethnic and religious equality, as part of an imagined Balkan Federation. Delchev completed his secondary education in the Bulgarian Men's High School of Thessaloniki and entered the Military School of His Princely Highness in Sofia, but he was dismissed from there, only a month before his graduation, because of his leftist political persuasions. Then he returned to Ottoman Macedonia as a Bulgarian teacher, and immediately became an activist of the newly-found revolutionary movement in 1894.

Although considering himself to be an inheritor of the Bulgarian revolutionary traditions, as a committed republican Delchev was disillusioned by the reality in the post-liberation Bulgarian monarchy. Also by him, as by many Macedonian Bulgarians, originating from an area with mixed population, the idea of being ‘Macedonian’ acquired the importance of a certain native loyalty, that constructed a specific spirit of "local patriotism" and "multi-ethnic regionalism". He maintained the slogan promoted by William Ewart Gladstone, "Macedonia for the Macedonians", including all different nationalities inhabiting the area. In this way, his outlook included a wide range of such disparate ideas as Bulgarian patriotism, Macedonian regionalism, anti-nationalism, and incipient socialism. As a result, his political agenda became the establishment through revolution of an autonomous Macedono-Adrianople supranational state into the framework of the Ottoman Empire, as a prelude to its incorporation within a future Balkan Federation. Despite he had been educated in the spirit of Bulgarian nationalism, he revised the Organization's statute, where the membership was restricted only for Bulgarians. In this way he emphasized the importance of the cooperation among all ethnic groups in the territories concerned in order to obtain political autonomy.

Today Gotse Delchev is considered as a national hero in Bulgaria, as well as in North Macedonia, where it is claimed that he was among the founders of the Macedonian national movement. Macedonian historians insist that the myth of Delchev there is so significant that it is more important than all of the historical research and documents, and therefore his (Bulgarian) ethnic identification should not be discussed. Despite such controversial Macedonian historical interpretations, Delchev had clear Bulgarian ethnic identity and viewed his compatriots as Bulgarians. Some leading modern Macedonian historians, public intellectuals and politicians have recognized this begrudgingly or even openly acknowledged that fact. The designation Macedonian according to the then used ethnic terminology was an umbrella term, used for the local nationalities, and when applied to the local Slavs, it meant a regional Bulgarian identity. Opposite to the Macedonian claims, at that time even some IMRO revolutionaries natives from Bulgaria, as Delchev's friend Peyo Yavorov, espoused Macedonian political identity. However, his autonomist ideas of a separate Macedonian (and Adrianopolitan) political entity, have stimulated the subsequent development of Macedonian nationalism. Nevertheless, some researchers doubt, that behind the IMRO idea of autonomy was hidden a reserve plan for eventual incorporation into Bulgaria, backed by Delchev himself. However, other researchers find the identity of Delchev and other major figures to be "open to different interpretations",  that are incompatible to the views of modern Balkan nationalisms.

Biography

Early life 
He was born to a large family on 4 February 1872 (23 January according to the Julian calendar) in Kılkış (Kukush), then in the Ottoman Empire (today in Greece). By the mid-19th century, Kılkış was populated predominantly with Macedonian Bulgarians and became one of the centres of the Bulgarian national revival. During the 1860s and 1870s it was under the jurisdiction of the Bulgarian Uniate Church, but after 1884 most of its population gradually joined the Bulgarian Exarchate. As a student, Delchev studied first at the Bulgarian Uniate primary school and then at the Bulgarian Exarchate junior high school. He also read widely in the town's chitalishte, where he was impressed with revolutionary books, and was especially imbued with thoughts of the liberation of Bulgaria. In 1888 his family sent him to the Bulgarian Men's High School of Thessaloniki, where he organized and led a secret revolutionary brotherhood. Delchev also distributed revolutionary literature, which he acquired from the school's graduates who studied in Bulgaria. Graduation from high school was faced with few career prospects and Delchev decided to follow the path of his former school-mate Boris Sarafov, entering the military school in Sofia in 1891. He at first encountered the newly independent Bulgaria full of idealism and dedication, but he later became disappointed with the commercialized life of the society and with the authoritarian politics of the prime minister Stefan Stambolov, accused of being a dictator. 

Gotsе spent his leaves in the company of emigrants from Macedonia. Most of them belonged to the Young Macedonian Literary Society. One of his friends was Vasil Glavinov, a leader of the Macedonian-Adrianople faction of the Bulgarian Social Democratic Workers Party. Through Glavinov and his comrades, he came into contact with different people, who offered a new forms of social struggle. In June 1892, Delchev and the journalist Kosta Shahov, a chairman of the Young Macedonian Literary Society, met in Sofia with the bookseller from Thessaloniki, Ivan Hadzhinikolov. Hadzhinikolov disclosed on this meeting his plans to create a revolutionary organization in Ottoman Macedonia. They discussed together its basic principles and agreed fully on all scores. Delchev explained, he has no intention of remaining an officer and promised after graduating from the Military School, he will return to Macedonia to join the organization. In September 1894, only a month before graduation, he was expelled because of his political activity as a member of an illegal socialist circle. He was given a possibility to enter the Army again through re-applying for a commission, but he refused. Afterwards he returned to European Turkey to work there as a Bulgarian teacher, aiming to get involved into the new liberation movement. At that time IMRO was in its early stages of development,  forming its committees around the Bulgarian Exarchate schools.

Teacher and revolutionary 

Meanwhile, in Ottoman Thessaloniki a revolutionary organization was founded in 1893, by a small band of anti-Ottoman Macedono-Bulgarian revolutionaries, including Hadzhinikolov. At this time the name of the organization was Bulgarian Macedonian-Adrianople Revolutionary Committees (BMARC), in 1902 changed to Secret Macedonian-Adrianople Revolutionary Organization (SMARO). It was decided at a meeting in Resen in August 1894 to preferably recruit teachers from the Bulgarian schools as committee members. In the autumn of 1894 Delchev became teacher in an Exarchate school in Štip, where he met another teacher: Dame Gruev, who was also a leader of the newly established local committee of BMARC. As a result of the close friendship between the two, Delchev joined the organization immediately, and gradually became one of its main leaders. After this, both Gruev and Delchev worked together in Štip and its environs. At the same time, the Organization developed quickly and had managed to begin establishing a network of local organizations across Macedonia and the Adrianople Vilayet, usually centered around the schools of the Bulgarian Exarchate. The expansion of the BMARC at the time was considerable, particularly after Gruev settled in Thessaloniki during the years 1895–1897, in the quality of a Bulgarian school inspector. Under his direction, Delchev travelled during the vacations throughout Macedonia and established and organized committees in villages and cities. Delchev also established contacts with some of the leaders of the Supreme Macedonian-Adrianople Committee (SMAC). Its official declaration was a struggle for autonomy of Macedonia and Thrace. However, as a rule, most of SMAC's leaders were officers with stronger connections with the governments, waging terrorist struggle against the Ottomans in the hope of provoking a war and thus Bulgarian annexation of both areas. He arrived illegally in Bulgaria's capital and tried to get support from the SMAC's leadership. Delchev had a number of meetings with Danail Nikolaev, Yosif Kovachev, Toma Karayovov, Andrey Lyapchev and others, but he was often frustrated of their views. As a whole, Delchev had a negative attitude towards their activities. After spending the next school year (1895/1896) as a teacher in the town of Bansko, in May 1896 he was arrested by the Ottoman authorities as person suspected in revolutianary activity and spent about a month in jail. Later Delchev participated in the Thessaloniki Congress of BMARC in the Summer.  Afterwards, Delchev gave his resignation as teacher and, in the Autumn of 1896, he moved back to Bulgaria, where he, together with Gyorche Petrov, served as a foreign representatives of the organization in Sofia. At that time the organization was largely dependent on the Bulgarian state and army assistance, that was mediated by the foreign representatives.

Revolutionary activity as part of the leadership of the Organization 

Delchev's involvement in BMARC was an important moment in the history of the Macedonian-Adrianople liberation movement. The years between the end of 1896, when he left the Exarchate's educational system and 1903 when he died, represented the final and most effective revolutionary phase of his short life. In the period 1897–1902 he was a representative of the Foreign Committee of the BMARC in Sofia. Again in Sofia, negotiating with suspicious politicians and arms merchants, Delchev saw more of the unpleasant face of the Principality, and became even more disillusioned with its political system. In 1897 he, along with Gyorche Petrov, wrote the new organization's statute, which divided Macedonia and Adrianople areas into seven regions, each with a regional structure and secret police, following the Internal Revolutionary Organization's example. Below the regional committees were districts. The Central committee was placed in Thessaloniki. In 1898 Delchev decided to be created a permanent acting armed bands (chetas) in every district. From 1902 till his death he was the leader of the chetas, i.e. the military institute of the Organization because, he had considerable knowledge in the area of military skills. Delchev ensured the functioning of the underground border crossings of the organization and the arms depots added to them, alongside the then Bulgarian-Ottoman border.

His correspondence with other BMARC/SMARO members covers extensive data on supplies, transport and storage of weapons and ammunition in Macedonia.  Delchev envisioned independent production of weapons, and traveled in 1897 to Odessa, where he met with Armenian revolutionaries Stepan Zorian and Christapor Mikaelian to exchange terrorist skills and especially bomb-making. That resulted in the establishment of a bomb manufacturing plant in the village of Sabler near Kyustendil in Bulgaria. The bombs were later smuggled across the Ottoman border into Macedonia. Gotse Delchev was the first to organize and lead a band into Macedonia with the purpose of robbing or kidnapping rich Turks. His experiences demonstrate the weaknesses and difficulties which the Organization faced in its early years. Later he was one of the organizers of the Miss Stone Affair. He made two short visits to the Adrianople area of Thrace in 1896 and 1898. In the winter of 1900 he resided for a while in Burgas, where Delchev organized another bomb manufacturing plant, which dynamite was used later by the Thessaloniki bombings. In 1900 he inspected also the BMARC's detachments in Eastern Thrace again, aiming better coordination between Macedonian and Thracian revolutionary committees. After the assassination in July of the Romanian newspaper editor Ștefan Mihăileanu, who had published unflattering remarks about the Macedonian affairs, Bulgaria and Romania were brought to the brink of war. At that time Delchev was preparing to organize a detachment which, in a possible war to support the Bulgarian army by its actions in Northern Dobruja, where compact Bulgarian population was available. Since the Autumn of 1901 till the early Spring of 1902, he made an important inspection in Macedonia, touring all revolutionary districts there. He led also the congress of the Adrianople revolutionary district held in Plovdiv in April 1902. Afterwards Delchev inspected the BMARC's structures in the Central Rhodopes. The inclusion of the rural areas into the organizational districts contributed to the expansion of the organization and the increase in its membership, while providing the essential prerequisites for the formation of the military power of the organization, at the same time having Delchev as its military advisor (inspector) and chief of all internal revolutionary bands.

After 1897 there was a rapid growth of secret Officer's brotherhoods, whose members by 1900 numbered about a thousand. Much of the Brotherhoods' activists were involved in the revolutionary activity of the BMARC. Among the main supporters of their activities was Gotse Delchev. Delchev aimed also better coordination between BMARC and the Supreme Macedonian-Adrianople Committee. For a short time in the late 1890s lieutenant Boris Sarafov, who was former school-mate of Delchev became its leader. At that period the foreign representatives Delchev and Petrov became by rights members of the leadership of the Supreme Committee and so BMARC even managed to gain de facto control of the SMAC. Nevertheless, it soon split into two factions: one loyal to the BMARC and one led by some officers close to the Bulgarian prince. Delchev opposed this officers' insistent attempts to gain control over the activity of BMARC. Sometimes SMAC even clashed militarily with local SMARO bands as in the autumn of 1902. Then the Supreme Macedonian-Adrianople Committee organized a failed uprising in Pirin Macedonia (Gorna Dzhumaya), which merely served to provoke Ottoman repressions and hampered the work of the underground network of SMARO.

The primary question regarding the timing of the uprising in Macedonia and Thrace implicated an apparent discordance not only among the SMAC and the SMARO, but also among the SMARO's leadership. At the Thessaloniki Congress of January 1903, where Delchev did not participate, an early uprising was debated and it was decided to stage one in the Spring of 1903. This led to fierce debates among the representatives at the Sofia SMARO's Conference in March 1903. By that time two strong tendencies had crystallized within the SMARO. The right-wing majority was convinced that if the Organization would unleash a general uprising,  Bulgaria would be provoked to declare war of the Ottomans and after the subsequent intervention of the Great Powers the Empire would collapse.

Delchev also launched the establishment of a secret revolutionary network, that would prepare the population for an armed uprising against the Ottoman rule. Delchev opposed the IMRO Central Committee's plan for a mass uprising in the summer of 1903, favoring terrorist and guerilla tactics. Deltchev, who was under the influence of the leading Bulgarian anarchists as Mihail Gerdzhikov and Varban Kilifarski personally opposed the IMRO Central Committee's plan for a mass uprising in the summer of 1903, instead supporting the tactics of terrorist and guerilla tactics such as the Thessaloniki bombings of 1903. Finally, he had no choice but agree to that course of action at least managing to delay its start from May to August. Delchev also convinced the SMARO leadership to transform its idea of a mass rising involving the civil population into a rising based on guerrilla warfare. Towards the end of March 1903 Gotse with his detachment destroyed the railway bridge over the Angista river, aiming to test the new guerrilla tactics. Following that he set out for Thessaloniki to meet with Dame Gruev after his release from prison in March 1903. Dame Gruev met with Delchev in the late April and they discussed the decision of starting the uprising. Afterwards they negotiated with some of the Thessaloniki bombers to ask them to give up the attacks as dangerous to the liberation movement, or at least to wait for the impending uprising. Subsequently, Delchev met also with Ivan Garvanov, who was at that time the leader of the SMARO. After this meetings Delchev headed for Mount Ali Botush where he was expected to meet with representatives from the Serres Revolutionary District detachments and to check their military preparation. But he never arrived.

Death and aftermath 

Meanwhile, on 28 April, members of the Gemidzii circle started terrorist attacks in Thessaloniki. As a consequence martial law was declared in the city and many Turkish soldiers and "bashibozouks" were concentrated in the Salonica Vilayet. This led eventually to the tracking of Delchev's cheta and his subsequent death. He died on 4 May 1903, in a skirmish with the Turkish police near the village of Banitsa, probably after betrayal by local villagers, as rumours asserted, while preparing the Ilinden-Preobrazhenie Uprising. Thus the liberation movement lost its most important organizer, at the eve of the Ilinden–Preobrazhenie Uprising. After being identified by the local authorities in Serres, the bodies of Delchev and his comrade, Dimitar Gushtanov, were buried in a common grave in Banitsa. Soon afterwards SMARO, aided by SMAC organized the uprising against the Ottomans, which after initial successes, was crushed with much loss of life. Two of his brothers, Mitso Delchev and Milan Delchev were also killed fighting against the Ottomans as militants in the SMARO chetas of the Bulgarian voivodas Hristo Chernopeev and Krstjo Asenov in 1901 and 1903, respectively. In 1914, by a royal decree of Tsar Ferdinand I, a pension for life was granted to their father Nikola Delchev, because of the contribution of his sons to the freedom of Macedonia. During the Second Balkan War of 1913, Kilkis, which had been annexed by Bulgaria in the First Balkan War, was taken by the Greeks. Virtually all of its pre-war 7,000 Bulgarian inhabitants, including Delchev's family, were expelled to Bulgaria by the Greek Army. The same happened to the population of Banitsa, the village where Delchev was buried. During Balkan Wars, when Bulgaria was temporarily in control of the area, Delchev's remains were transferred to Xanthi, then in Bulgaria. After Western Thrace was ceded to Greece in 1919, the relic was brought to Plovdiv and in 1923 to Sofia, where it rested until after World War II. During World War II, the area was taken by the Bulgarians again and Delchev's grave near Banitsa was restored. In May 1943, on the occasion of the 40th anniversary of his death, a memorial plaque was set in Banitsa, in the presence of his sisters and other public figures. Until the end of the WWII Delchev was considered one of the greatest Bulgarians in the region of Macedonia.

The first biographical book about Delchev was issued in 1904 by his friend and comrade in arms, the Bulgarian poet Peyo Yavorov. The most detailed biography of Delchev in English is written by Mercia MacDermott: "Freedom or Death: The Life of Gotse Delchev".

Controversy

Cold war period 

In 1934 the Comintern gave its support to the idea that the Macedonian Slavs constituted a separate nation. Prior to the Second World War, this view on the Macedonian issue had been of little practical importance. However, during the war these ideas were supported by the pro-Yugoslav Macedonian communist partisans, who strengthened their positions in 1943, referring to the ideals of Gotse Delchev. After the Red Army entered the Balkans in late 1944, new communist regimes came into power in Bulgaria and Yugoslavia. In this way their policy on the Macedonian Question was committed to the Comintern policy of supporting the development of a distinct ethnic Macedonian consciousness. The region of Macedonia was proclaimed as the connecting link for the establishment of a future Balkan Communist Federation. The newly established Yugoslav People's Republic of Macedonia, was characterized as the natural result of Delchev's aspirations for autonomous Macedonia.

However, initially, he was proclaimed by its Communist leader Lazar Koliševski as: "...one Bulgarian of no significance for the liberation struggles...". But at the beginning of 1946, a conference of the Macedonian Communists was held, at which Vasil Ivanovski presented a report entitled "Current Issues in Macedonia". The report claimed that Gotse may have considered himself and the Macedonian Slavs Bulgarians, but he was not clear about the ethnic character of the Macedonians. As a result on 7 October 1946, under pressure from Moscow, as part of the policy to foster the development of Macedonian national consciousness, Delchev's remains were transported to Skopje. On 10 October, the bones were enshrined in a marble sarcophagus in the yard of the church "Sveti Spas", where they have remained since. Delchev's name became part of the anthem of SR Macedonia - Today over Macedonia. After the Tito–Stalin split in 1948, the then Macedonian communist elite discussed the idea to scrap the name of Delchev from the anthem of the country, as he was suspected again of being Bulgarophile element, but this idea was finally abandoned. 

After realizing that the Balkan collective memory had already accepted the heroes of the Macedonian revolutionary movement as Bulgarians, Yugoslav authorities exerted efforts to claim Delchev for the Macedonian national cause. Aiming to enforce the belief that Delchev was an ethnic Macedonian, all documents written by him in standard Bulgarian were translated into standard Macedonian, and presented as originals. As a result, Delchev was declared an ethnic Macedonian hero, and Macedonian school textbooks began even to hint at Bulgarian complicity in his death. In the People's Republic of Bulgaria, before 1960, Delchev was given mostly regional recognition in Pirin Macedonia. Afterwards, orders from the highest political level were given to reincorporate the Macedonian revolutionary movement as part of the Bulgarian historiography and to prove the Bulgarian credentials of its historical leaders. Since 1960, there have been long unproductive debates between the ruling Communist parties in Bulgaria and Yugoslavia about the ethnic affiliation of Delchev. Delchev was described in SR Macedonia not only as an anti-Ottoman freedom fighter, but also as a hero, who had opposed the aggressive aspirations of the pro-Bulgarian factions in the liberation movement. The claims on Delchev's Bulgarian self-identification, thus were portrayed as a recent Bulgarian chauvinist attitude of long provenance. Nonetheless, the Bulgarian side made in 1978 for the first time the proposal that some historical personalities (e.g. Gotse Delchev) could be regarded as belonging to the shared historical heritage of the two peoples, but that proposal did not appeal to the Yugoslavs.

Post-communism 

After the breakup of Yugoslavia and the fall of Communism, Delchev's ethnic identity has continued to be disputed in North Macedonia, serving as a point of contention with Bulgaria. Some attempts were made for the joint celebration of Delchev between North Macedonia and Bulgaria. Bulgarian diplomats were also attacked when honoring Delchev by Macedonian nationalist. However, on 2 August 2017, the Bulgarian Prime Minister Boyko Borisov and his Macedonian colleague Zoran Zaev placed wreaths at the grave of Gotse Delchev on the occasion of the 114th anniversary of the Ilinden–Preobrazhenie Uprising. The Macedonian side has recently been interested to negotiate about Delchev. A joint commission on historical issues was also formed in 2018 to resolve controversial historical readings, including the dispute about Delchev's ethnic identity, which remains unresolved. The Association of Historians in North Macedonia came out against the calls for a joint celebration of Delchev, seeing them as a threat to Macedonian national identity.

Nevertheless, on February 4, 2023, on the 151st anniversary of the birth of the revolutionary, both the Macedonian and Bulgarian side paid their respects at the St. Spas Church in Skopje separately, while the delegation of North Macedonia declined the offer to jointly lay wreaths proposed by the Bulgarian delegation. Many Bulgarian citizens who wanted to attend the event were held for hours at the border due to the malfunction of the border system. However, problems with the admission of the Bulgarians continued even after the processing of their documents. As a result, some Bulgarian citizens and journalists were prevented from crossing. Three citizens were detained, fined and banned from entering the country for 3 years, due to attempting to physically assault policemen. According to their lawyer, two of them were apparently beaten. Sofia officially reacted sharply to these events.

Delchev's views 

The international, cosmopolitan views of Delchev could be summarized in his proverbial sentence: "I understand the world solely as a field for cultural competition among the peoples". In the late 19th century the anarchists and socialists from Bulgaria linked their struggle closely with the revolutionary movements in Macedonia and Thrace. Thus, as a young cadet in Sofia Delchev became a member of a left circle, where he was strongly influenced by the modern than Marxist and Bakunin's ideas. His views were formed also under the influence of the ideas of earlier anti-Ottoman fighters as Levski, Botev, and Stoyanov, who were among the founders of the Bulgarian Internal Revolutionary Organization, the Bulgarian Revolutionary Central Committee and the Bulgarian Secret Central Revolutionary Committee, respectively. Later he participated in the Internal organization's struggle and as well educated leader, became one of its theoreticians and co-author of the BMARC's statute from 1896.
Developing his ideas further in 1902 he took the step, together with other left functionaries, of changing its nationalistic character, which determined that members of the organization can be only Bulgarians. The new supra-nationalistic statute renamed it to Secret Macedono-Adrianopolitan Revolutionary Organization (SMARO), which was to be an insurgent organization, open to all Macedonians and Thracians regardless of nationality, who wished to participate in the movement for their autonomy. This scenario was partially facilitated by the Treaty of Berlin (1878), according to which Macedonia and Adrianople areas were given back from Bulgaria to the Ottomans, but especially by its unrealized 23rd. article, which promised future autonomy for unspecified territories in European Turkey, settled with Christian population. In general, an autonomous status was presumed to imply a special kind of constitution of the region, a reorganization of gendarmerie, broader representation of the local Christian population in it as well as in all the administration, similarly to what happened in the short-lived Eastern Rumelia. However, there was not a clear political agenda behind IMRO's idea about autonomy and its final outcome, after the expected dissolution of the Ottoman Empire. Delcev, like other left-wing activists, vaguely determined the bonds in the future common Macedonian-Adrianople autonomous region on the one hand, and on the other between it, the Principality of Bulgaria, and de facto annexed Eastern Rumelia. Even the possibility that Bulgaria could be absorbed into a future autonomous Macedonia, rather than the reverse, was discussed. It is claimed that the personal view of the convinced republican Delchev, was much more likely to see inclusion in a future Balkan Confederative Republic, or eventually an incorporation into Bulgaria. Both ideas were probably influenced by the views of the founders of the organization. The ideas of a separate Macedonian nation and language were as yet promoted only by small circles of intellectuals in Delchev's time, and failed to gain wide popular support. As a whole the idea of autonomy was strictly political and did not imply a secession from Bulgarian ethnicity. In fact, for militants such as Delchev and other leftists, that participated in the national movement retaining a political outlook, national liberation meant "radical political liberation through shaking off the social shackles".  There aren't any indications suggesting his doubt about the Bulgarian ethnic character of the Macedonian Slavs at that time. Delchev also used the Bulgarian standard language, and he was not in any way interested in the creation of separate Macedonian language. The Bulgarian ethnic self-identification of Delchev has been recognized as from leading international researchers of the Macedonian Question, as well as from part of the Macedonian historical scholarship and political elite, although reluctantly. However, despite his Bulgarian loyalty, he was against any chauvinistic propaganda and nationalism. According to him, no outside force could or would help the Organization and it ought to rely only upon itself and only upon its own will and strength. He thought that any intervention by Bulgaria would provoke intervention by the neighboring states as well, and could result in Macedonia and Thrace being torn apart. That is why the peoples of these two regions had to win their own freedom, within the frontiers of an autonomous Macedonian-Adrianople state.

Despite the efforts of the post-1945 Macedonian historiography to represent Delchev as a Macedonian separatist rather than a Bulgarian nationalist, Delchev himself has stated: "...We are Bulgarians and all suffer from one common disease [e.g., the Ottoman rule]" and "Our task is not to shed the blood of Bulgarians, of those who belong to the same people that we serve".

Legacy 

Delchev is today regarded both in Bulgaria and in North Macedonia as an important national hero, and both nations see him as part of their own national history. His memory is honoured especially in the Bulgarian part of Macedonia and among the descendants of Bulgarian refugees from other parts of the region, where he is regarded as the most important revolutionary from the second generation of freedom fighters. His name appears also in the national anthem of North Macedonia: "Denes nad Makedonija". There are two towns named in his honour: Gotse Delchev in Bulgaria and Delčevo in North Macedonia. There are also two peaks named after Delchev: Gotsev Vrah, the summit of Slavyanka Mountain, and Delchev Vrah or Delchev Peak on Livingston Island, South Shetland Islands in Antarctica, which was named after him by the scientists from the Bulgarian Antarctic Expedition. Delchev Ridge on Livingston Island bears also his name. The Goce Delčev University of Štip in North Macedonia carries his name too. Today many artifacts related to Delchev's activity are stored in different museums across Bulgaria and North Macedonia.

During the time of SFR Yugoslavia, a street in Belgrade was named after Delchev. In 2015, Serbian nationalists covered the signs with the street's name and affixed new ones with the name of the Chetniks' activist Kosta Pecanac. They claimed that Delchev was a Bulgarian and his name has no place there. Though in 2016 the street's name was changed officially by the municipal authorities to Fyodor Tolbukhin, a Russian general who led the Belgrade operation at the end of the Second World War. Their motivation was that Delchev was not an ethnic Macedonian revolutionary, but an activist of an anti-Serbian organization with pro-Bulgarian orientation.

In Greece the official appeals from Bulgarian side to the authorities to install a memorial plaque on his place of death are not answered. The memorial plaques set periodically by enthusiast Bulgarians afterwards are removed. Bulgarian tourists are restrained occasionally to visit the place.

Memorials

Notes

References

Sources 
 Пандев, К. "Устави и правилници на ВМОРО преди Илинденско-Преображенското въстание", Исторически преглед, 1969, кн. I, стр. 68–80. 
 Пандев, К. "Устави и правилници на ВМОРО преди Илинденско-Преображенското въстание", Извeстия на Института за история, т. 21, 1970, стр. 250–257. 
 Битоски, Крсте, сп. "Македонско Време", Скопје – март 1997, quoting: Quoting: Public Record Office – Foreign Office 78/4951 Turkey (Bulgaria), From Elliot, 1898, Устав на ТМОРО. S. 1. published in Документи за борбата на македонскиот народ за самостојност и за национална држава, Скопје, Универзитет "Кирил и Методиј": Факултет за филозофско-историски науки, 1981, pp 331 – 333. 
 Hugh Pouton Who Are the Macedonians?, C. Hurst & Co, 2000. p. 53. 
 Fikret Adanir, Die Makedonische Frage: ihre entestehung und etwicklung bis 1908., Wiessbaden 1979, p. 112.
 Duncan Perry The Politics of Terror: The Macedonian Liberation Movements, 1893–1903 , Durham, Duke University Press, 1988. pp. 40–41, 210 n. 10.
 Friedman, V. (1997) "One Grammar, Three Lexicons: Ideological Overtones and Underpinnings of the Balkan Sprachbund" in CLS 33 Papers from the 33rd Regional Meeting of the Chicago Linguistic Society. (Chicago : Chicago Linguistic Society)
 Димитър П. Евтимов, Делото на Гоце Делчев, Варна, изд. на варненското Македонско културно-просветно дружество "Гоце Делчев", 1937. 
 Пейо Яворов, "Събрани съчинения", Том втори, "Гоце Делчев", Издателство "Български писател", София, 1977.  In English: Peyo Yavorov, "Complete Works", Volume 2, biography "Delchev", Publishing house "Bulgarian writer", Sofia, 1977.
 MacDermott, Mercia. (1978) Freedom or Death: The Life of Gotse Delchev Journeyman Press, London and West Nyack. .

External links 

1872 births
1903 deaths
People from Kilkis
People from Salonica vilayet
Members of the Internal Macedonian Revolutionary Organization
Macedonian Bulgarians
Bulgarians from Aegean Macedonia
Macedonia under the Ottoman Empire
Bulgarian revolutionaries
Bulgarian educators
Bulgarian Men's High School of Thessaloniki alumni
Bulgarian military personnel